Marvel Super Hero Squad is a comic book series based on The Super Hero Squad Show. The series lasted for 4 issues and then ended. Instead Marvel Comics started a monthly comic book series called Super Hero Squad, according to Marvel.com.

Premise
On September 9, 2009, Marvel published the first "Super Hero Squad" comic - a one-shot reprinting several Super Hero Squad comic strips that had originally been published on Marvel.com. The one-shot was followed by a four issue limited series with stories inspired by the television series. At its conclusion, in March 2010, Marvel began publishing a regular monthly "Super Hero Squad" comic book. There has been 12 issues of the comic franchise has been released, in the USA. It is unknown whether new issues will be released since no new issues have been recently released.

Comic Guide

Limited series
 Freaky Fractal Friday! - 
 And Lo, There Shall Be a Reptil! - 
 Imperius Wrecks! - 
 Every Inhuman Has Its Day! -

Monthly series
 Issue 1 - The Super Hero Squad members are turned into babies.
 Issue 2 - Enchantress and Mystique compete to win the hearts of the Super Hero Squad.
 Issue 3 - When a tiny jellyfish is transformed into a giant slimy blob, the Super Hero Squad have their hands full trying to keep it from engulfing all of Super Hero City. Meanwhile, Thor reflects on his childhood.
 Issue 4 - The Collector sends his minions to capture the Super Hero Squad and add them to his collection.
 Issue 5 - In honor of World War Hulks, this issue depicts an Infinity Fractal turning any superhero exposed to it into Hulkified versions of themselves.
 Issue 6 - When an Infinity Fractal turns a paleontologist into Stegron, Speedball teams up with the Super Hero Squad when they venture into the Savage Land to stop Stegron from amassing a dinosaur army. Meanwhile, Doctor Doom sends Klaw to use his sound-based talents to locate any Infinity Fractals.
 Issue 7 - Ringmaster uses his hypnotic powers to mesmerize the Super Hero Squad into thinking that they are performers in his circus allowing Doctor Doom and the Lethal Legion to raid the S.H.I.E.L.D. Helicarrier to find the Infinity Fractals.
 Issue 8 - Discovering that different Fractals possess different qualities, the Super Hero Squad are stunned when one falls nearby and imbues them with the power of overweightedness.
 Issue 9 - She-Hulk, Tigra, and Wasp want to join up with the Super Hero Squad.
 Issue 10 - The Super Hero Squad celebrate Halloween when a mysterious macabre menace crashes their Halloween party, called the Man-Thing.
 Issue 11 - In the wild west, the western versions of the Super Hero Squad face off against a western version of Doctor Doom.
 Issue 12 - The Super Hero Squad teams up with Santa Claus to make sure Christmas goes off without a hitch.
 Marvel Super Hero Squad Spectacular - Beyonder has transported the Super Hero Squad and their enemies to his prison planet to do battle with one another.

References

2010 comics debuts
2009 comics debuts